End Poverty in California (EPIC) was a political campaign started in 1934 by socialist writer Upton Sinclair (best known as author of The Jungle).  The movement formed the basis for Sinclair's campaign for Governor of California in 1934. The plan called for a massive public works program, sweeping tax reform, and guaranteed pensions. It gained major popular support, with thousands joining End Poverty Leagues across the state. EPIC never came to fruition due to Sinclair's defeat in the 1934 election, but is seen as an influence on New Deal programs enacted by President Franklin D. Roosevelt.

Plan
Sinclair laid out his vision for EPIC in his 1933 book I, Governor of California, and How I ended Poverty: A True Story of the Future. Specifically, the plan called for state seizure of idle factories and farm land where the owner had failed to pay property taxes. The government would then hire the unemployed to work on the farms and at the factories. The farms would then operate as self-sufficient, worker-run co-ops. EPIC also called for the implementation of California's first state income tax. The tax was to be progressive, with the wealthiest being taxed at 30%.  The plan would also have increased inheritance taxes and instituted a 4% tax on stock transfers.  EPIC also included government-provided pensions for the old, disabled, and widowed.  To implement EPIC, Sinclair called for the creation of three new government agencies: the California Authority for Land (CAL), the California Authority for Production (CAP), and the California Authority for Money (CAM).  CAL was to implement the plan for seizure and cultivation of unused farm lands.  CAP was to do the same for idle factories.  CAM meanwhile was to be used to finance CAL and CAP by issuing scrip to workers and issues bonds for the purchase of lands, factories, and machinery.

Campaign
After two previous unsuccessful runs for the U.S. Congress as a member of the Socialist Party, Sinclair was encouraged by the election of President Roosevelt in 1932 to switch his affiliation to the Democratic Party in September 1933. A grassroots movement soon formed in support of EPIC, with thousands joining End Poverty Leagues across the state. A weekly newspaper, the EPIC News, appeared in support of the plan, and reached a circulation of nearly a million by the time of the gubernatorial primary election in August 1934.  Several EPIC-supporting candidates won their primaries for California State Assembly and Senate seats. Sinclair did not receive full support from the party establishment, however, and Roosevelt refused to endorse him, seeing the EPIC plan as too radical. Sinclair's opponent's claimed that he sought to "Sovietize California".

The Socialist party in California and nationwide refused to allow its members to be active in any other party including the Democratic Party and expelled him, along with socialists who supported his California campaign.  The expulsions destroyed the Socialist party in California.

EPIC faced major opposition by the Republican Party and major media figures. According to Greg Mitchell's 2017 article on EPIC in The Nation, opponents of EPIC "organized the most lavish and creative dirty-tricks campaign ever seen—one that was to become a landmark in American politics" involving "turning over a major campaign to outside advertising, publicity, media and fundraising consultants for the first time."

The heads of Hollywood's major movie studios strongly opposed EPIC, largely due to Sinclair's proposal to hand over idle movie studio lots to unemployed film workers to make movies of their own.  The studio heads reacted by threatening to move film operations to Florida and deducting money from employee paychecks to finance the campaign of Sinclair's Republican opponent for governor, Frank Merriam.  Two of California's most influential figures in print media, William Randolph Hearst and Harry Chandler, also used their papers to support Merriam's campaign and attack Sinclair.

In the face of this coordinated opposition, and without the backing of Roosevelt, Sinclair fell behind Merriam in the polls. On November 6, 1934, Merriam defeated Sinclair with 1,138,629 (48.9%) to Sinclair's 879,537 (37.8%). Even in defeat, Sinclair received twice as many votes as any previous Democratic candidate for governor. In addition, two dozen candidates running on the EPIC platform were elected to the state legislature, including Culbert Olson, who became Governor four years later.

Movement
The EPIC movement continued after Sinclair's defeat.  It "recalled a mayor, kicked out a district attorney, replaced the governor with one of our choice" between 1934 and 1938, according to Robert A. Heinlein, who by then was deputy publisher of the EPIC News.  Heinlein also ran for State Assembly in Hollywood and Beverly Hills in 1938.  He lost, causing him to take up science fiction writing to pay off his campaign debt.

Legacy
Despite Sinclair's defeat, EPIC is recognized as having been very influential in shaping Roosevelt's New Deal programs. In late 1934, Harry Hopkins, a senior adviser to Roosevelt who went on to oversee many New Deal programs, proposed an "End Poverty in America" campaign that The New York Times wrote “differs from Sinclair's plan in detail, but not in principle.”

In 2022, universal basic income advocate and former Mayor of Stockton Michael Tubbs created "End Poverty in California" (EPIC), a nonprofit antipoverty organization with the same name and acronym that was inspired by Sinclair's campaign.
This movement is thought to have been extremely influential in California’s politics, as well as a standard for Democrats and Republicans. EPIC had a substantial role in the Federal Emergency Relief Administration, eventually helping provide for the unemployed. Other administrations, such as the Farm Security Administration, continued to carry on these acts favoring the EPIC movement.

Other candidates supported
 John W. Baumgartner, Los Angeles City Council member, 1933–35
 Parley Parker Christensen, Utah and California politician, Esperantist
 Delamere Francis McCloskey, Los Angeles City Council member, 1941–43
 Augustus F. Hawkins, California assemblyman 1935-63, US Representative, 1963-91, first African American Congressman from California

See also
 1934 California gubernatorial election
 Ham and Eggs Movement
 Townsend Plan

Sources

Further reading
 
 Wagner, Rob Leicester. Hollywood Bohemia: The Roots of Progressive Politics in Rob Wagner's Script (Janaway, 2016)
 Gregory, James N. "Upton Sinclair's 1934 EPIC Campaign: Anatomy of a Political Movement." Labor 12#4 (2015): 51-81.
 Mitchell, Greg. The campaign of the century: Upton Sinclair's race for governor of California and the birth of media politics (New York: Random House, 1992).
 Sinclair, Upton. The Literary Digest, October 13, 1934 End Poverty in California: The EPIC Movement
 Sinclair, Upton. Gregory et al., eds. "Upton Sinclair's End Poverty in California Campaign". washington.edu   Mapping American Social Movements Through the 20th Century project (U of Washington).
 Star, Kevin (1997). Endangered Dreams: The Great Depression in California. Oxford UP. .

References

Social history of California
Political history of California
Labor history of California
Poverty in the United States
Socialist Party of America
1934 in California
1934 in American politics